Rene Bond (October 11, 1950 – June 2, 1996) was an American film actress and stage performer. Bond began her acting career in softcore exploitation films produced by Harry Novak in the late 1960s before moving on to hardcore films in the early 1970s. She was active in the 1970s Los Angeles pornography scene, appearing in more than 80 films and loops.  She was noted for her petite figure and conveyed innocence or naivete in her acting approach.

Career
Bond starred in a number of softcore exploitation and sexploitation films, including The Jekyll and Hyde Portfolio (1971).

Bond was one of the first porn actresses to get breast implants. In a 1977 interview, she stated that this decision was in response to the "North American Breast Fetish", and claimed that she was offered more roles in films as a result of the implants. By the mid-70s, she had started her own mail-order company, selling still photos of herself and slides from her work. Her parents were aware of her work and accompanied her when she performed at burlesque and strip-tease shows. During these shows, Bond invited her father on stage, where she performed to the song "My Heart Belongs to Daddy".

Bond was inducted into the AVN Hall of Fame as well as the X-Rated Critics Organization Hall of Fame.

Later years and death
After retiring from acting in the late 1970s, Bond was married for a third time and resided in Las Vegas. On June 2, 1996, she died of liver cirrhosis at the age of 45.

References

External links 
 
 
 

1950 births
1996 deaths
20th-century American actresses
Actresses from San Diego
American female adult models
American film actresses
American pornographic film actresses
American burlesque performers
Deaths from cirrhosis
Pornographic film actors from California